Aref Lorestani (February 4, 1972 – April 15, 2017) was an Iranian actor. Lorestani started his professional career by playing a role in a sitcom, dubbed Jong 77, by famous Iranian director Mehran Modiri, in 1998 and continued appearing in his later series including Man With Two Thousand Faces (2009), Bitter Coffee (2010), My Villa (2012), I'm just kidding (2014) and In the Margins (2015).

He also played in Modiri's some other television shows, one of the most famous one was Qahveye Talkh (Bitter Coffee) in a role of a corrupt police, the first episodes of which were released in 2010.

Lorestani also played roles in a number of cinema movies, including Mani and Neda, by Parviz Sabri, Moadeleh (Equation) and Sham-e Arousi (Wedding Dinner) both by Ebrahim Vahidzadeh and Entekhab (Selection) by Touraj Mansouri.

References

1972 births
2017 deaths
Iranian male actors
Iranian comedians
People from Kermanshah